Vladislav Druzchenko (Cyrillic: Владислав Дружченко) is a male badminton player from Ukraine. He competed at the 1996, 2000, and 2008 Olympic Games.

Career
Between 1992 and 2006 he won 15 Ukrainian National Badminton Championships in a row in men's singles.

Druzchenko played the 2007 BWF World Championships in men's singles, and was defeated in the first round by Andrew Dabeka, of Canada, 16-21, 21-18, 21-16.

Achievements

European Junior Championships 
Boys' singles

Boys' doubles

IBF Grand Prix 
The World Badminton Grand Prix sanctioned by International Badminton Federation since 1983.

Men's singles

Mixed doubles

BWF International Challenge/Series
Men's singles

Men's doubles

Mixed doubles

 BWF International Challenge tournament
 BWF International Series/European Circuit tournament
 BWF Future Series tournament

References

External links
IBF Player Profile

1973 births
Living people
Sportspeople from Dnipro
Ukrainian male badminton players
Soviet male badminton players
Badminton players at the 1996 Summer Olympics
Badminton players at the 2000 Summer Olympics
Badminton players at the 2008 Summer Olympics
Olympic badminton players of Ukraine
21st-century Ukrainian people